X's and O's, Exes and Ohs, Ex's and Oh's, and other variants in spelling of that phrase may refer to: 

 Xs and Os, another name for the game Tic-tac-toe

Music
 "Ex's and Oh's" (Atreyu song), 2006
 "Ex's & Oh's", a 2014 song by Elle King
 "XXX's and OOO's (An American Girl)", a 1994 song by Trisha Yearwood

Multimedia
 Exes & Ohs, a 2007 Canadian/American cable TV series
 X's and O's (film), a 2007 film starring Clayne Crawford
 Podcast presented by Dennis Xhaët

See also
XO (disambiguation)
XOXO (disambiguation)